The Thirroul Butchers are an Australian rugby league football team based in Thirroul, a coastal town of the Illawarra region. The club was formed in 1913 and entered the Illawarra Rugby League, where it still competes today.

History
The Thirroul Butchers were established in 1913, entering the third season of the Illawarra Rugby League competition. On 20 May 1913 Thirroul (at the time also known as "The Blues") competed in their first premiership match, with a 13-3 loss to Unanderra. The team listed was: Dansfield, A. Lacey, E.Lacey, Hopkinson, Coulton, Grace, McDonald, Ryan, Moore, Green, Fraser, Schalel and Clarke.

Players

Notable former players
 Glen Air (1994-02 Illawarra Steelers, London Broncos, and West Tigers)
 Brent Grose (2001-08 Cronulla Sharks, South Sydney Rabbitohs, Warrington Wolves, and Sydney Roosters)
 Trent Waterhouse (Penrith Panthers (2002-2011), Warrington Wolves(2012-2014))
 Michael Howell (2002-04 St. George Illawarra Dragons)
 David Howell (2003-13 St. George Illawarra Dragons, Canberra Raiders, and London Broncos)
 Ryan Powell (2004-05 St. George Illawarra Dragons)
 Matt Prior (2008-20 St. George Illawarra Dragons and Cronulla Sharks)
 Max Bailey (2020 Sydney Roosters)
 Aaron Schoupp (2021- Canterbury Bulldogs and Gold Coast Titans)
 Toby Couchman (2023- St. George Illawarra Dragons)

Leading Pointscores

Honours
 Illawarra Rugby League Premierships: 8
1940, 1954, 1973, 1995, 1999, 2003, 2008, 2012
 Illawarra Minor Premierships: 4
1987, 1995, 2003, 2008
 CRL Challenge Cup:1
2003

References

External links
 Thirroul Butchers Clubpage
 Country Rugby League Homepage
 Country Rugby League
 Illawarra District League
 Illawarra Rugby League

Rugby league teams in Wollongong
Rugby clubs established in 1913
1913 establishments in Australia